The Happy Tailor (Swedish:Den glade skräddaren) is a 1945 Swedish comedy film directed by Gunnar Olsson and starring Edvard Persson, Mim Persson and Marianne Gyllenhammar.

The film's art direction was by Max Linder.

Main cast
 Edvard Persson as Sören Sörenson  
 Mim Persson as Boel Sörenson  
 Marianne Gyllenhammar as Anne-Marie  
 Ivar Kåge as Anders Bengt  
 Sture Djerf as Gunnar  
 Sven Bergvall as Sten  
 Ernst Wellton as Ingvar  
 Fritiof Billquist as Innkeeper  
 Carl Deurell as Mayor  
 Algot Larsson as Tok-Lars  
 Harald Svensson as Pihlquist  
 Josua Bengtson as Vicar  
 Birgitta Hoppeler as Daughter of Sören and Boel 
 Gunnel Nilsson as Daughter of Sören and Boel

References

Bibliography 
 Qvist, Per Olov & von Bagh, Peter. Guide to the Cinema of Sweden and Finland. Greenwood Publishing Group, 2000.

External links 
 

1945 films
1945 comedy films
Swedish comedy films
1940s Swedish-language films
Films directed by Gunnar Olsson
Swedish black-and-white films
1940s Swedish films